= Bilkhiriya Kalan =

- village
- Location within Madhya Pradesh Location within India
- Coordinates: 23.2569279°N 77.5834339°E
- Country: India
- State: Madhya Pradesh
- District: Bhopal
- Tehsil: Huzur
- Elevation: 461 m (1,512 ft)

Population (2011)
  - Total: 1,372
- Time zone: UTC+5:30 (IST)
- ISO 3166 code: MP-IN
- 2011 census code: 482433

Bilkhiriya Kalan is a village in the Bhopal district of Madhya Pradesh, India. It is located in the Huzur tehsil and the Phanda block.

== Demographics ==
According to the 2011 census of India, Bilkhiriya Kalan has 293 households. The effective literacy rate (i.e. the literacy rate of population excluding children aged 6 and below) is 65.36%.

Demographics (2011 Census)
	Total	Male	Female
Population	1372	721	651
Children aged below 6 years	197	96	101
Scheduled caste	79	39	40
Scheduled tribe	75	37	38
Literates	768	458	310
Workers (all)	506	400	106
Main workers (total)	425	376	49
Main workers: Cultivators	31	30	1
Main workers: Agricultural labourers	12	9	3
Main workers: Household industry workers	18	15	3
Main workers: Other	364	322	42
Marginal workers (total)	81	24	57
Marginal workers: Cultivators	3	1	2
Marginal workers: Agricultural labourers	5	0	5
Marginal workers: Household industry workers	3	1	2
Marginal workers: Others	70	22	48
Non-workers	866	321	545
